Zodarion nigrifemur is a spider species found in Greece.

See also 
 List of Zodariidae species

References

External links 

nigrifemur
Spiders of Europe
Spiders described in 1948